Poro Michlyn Gahekave (born in 1993) is a Papua New Guinean middle-distance runner.

Career
Poro Gahekave competed at the Pacific Games in 2007. She (as a 14-year-old), won in Apia the inaugural gold medal of 3,000m steeplechase in 2007 and confirmed, 12 years later, this Gold medal and 2 more Gold (1500m and 5000m) again in Apia in 2019.

She also won the Silver medal in 2015 Pacific Games.

References

IAAF athlete’s profile

Living people

1993 births
Papua New Guinean female middle-distance runners
Place of birth missing (living people)